Jorge Alberto Ábrego Martínez (born 16 October 1964) is a former Salvadoran professional football player and currently manager.

Playing career

Playing career 
Nicknamed El Zapatero (The Shoemaker), Ábrego has played all of his professional career at FAS

Coaching career 
After he retired, Ábrego became a football manager.

Juventud Independiente 
In 2008, Ábrego signed as coach of Juventud Independiente.

Once Municipal 
In June 2008, Ábrego signed as coach of Once Municipal, replacing Mario Elias Guevara. In October 2009, Ábrego was replaced by Nelson Mauricio Ancheta.

Titán de Texistepeque 
In 2010, Ábrego signed as new coach of Titán.

FAS 
In September 2010, Ábrego was confirmed as new coach of FAS, replacing Alberto Rujana. Ábrego left the club in December 2010.

UES 
In September 2011, Ábrego as coach of the juvenile team of UES, along with Miguel Ángel Soriano, replaced Eraldo Correia. In January 2012, Ábrego was replaced by Roberto Gamarra.

Return to UES 
In October 2012, Ábrego signed as coach of UES, replacing Roberto Gamarra. In March 2013, Ábrego was replaced by assistant coach Miguel Ángel Díaz.

Real Destroyer 
In February 2015, Ábrego signed as coach of Real Destroyer, replacing Jorge Calles. In June 2015, Ábrego was replaced by Jorge Calles himself.

Return to Juventud Independiente 
In June 2015, Ábrego signed again as coach of Juventud Independiente.

Pasaquina 
In December 2015, Ábrego was confirmed as new assistant coach of Pasaquina for the Clausura 2016 tournament.

Audaz 
In September 2016, Ábrego signed as coach of Audaz, replacing René Angulo. In December 2016, Ábrego left the club.

Atlético Comalapa 
In December 2016, Ábrego signed as coach of Atlético Comalapa, replacing Pablo Quiñónez. In November 2017, Ábrego was replaced by German Pérez.

Topiltzín 
In January 2018, Ábrego signed as coach of Topiltzín for the Clausura 2018, replacing Sebastián Hernández. In May 2018, Ábrego was replaced by Manuel Carranza Murillo.

Platense 
Ábrego signed as new coach of Platense in 2018. In December 2018, Platense reached the finals of the Apertura 2018 of Segunda División.

International 
Ábrego made his debut for El Salvador in 1984, and has earned well over 40 caps.

He has played in three World Cup qualification series, for the 1986, 1990 and 1994 World Cup finals. He also played at the 1993 UNCAF Nations Cup.

Ábrego's final international was a May 1993 FIFA World Cup qualification match against Canada.

Honours

Player

Club
C.D. FAS
 Primera División
 Champion: 1984, 1994–95, 1995–96
 Runners-up: Clausura 1999

Manager

Club
Real Destroyer
 Segunda División
 Champion: Clausura 2015

References

External links
 Jorge Ábrego at Soccerway 

1964 births
Living people
Sportspeople from Santa Ana, El Salvador
Association football defenders
Salvadoran footballers
El Salvador international footballers
1993 UNCAF Nations Cup players
C.D. FAS footballers
Salvadoran football managers
C.D. FAS managers